Geotourism is tourism associated with geological attractions and destinations. Geotourism deals with the abiotic natural and built environments. Geotourism was first defined in England by Thomas Alfred Hose in 1995.

Definitions of modern geotourism
 

Most of the world defines geotourism as purely the study of geological and geomorphological features. The key definitions of modern geotourism (abiotic nature-based tourism) include:

 "...part of the tourist's activity in which they have the geological patrimony as their main attraction. Their objective is to search for protected patrimony through the conservation of their resources and of the tourist's Environmental Awareness. For that, the use of the interpretation of the patrimony makes it accessible to the lay public, promoting its popularization and the development of the Earth sciences".
 "Geotourism is a knowledge-based tourism, an interdisciplinary integration of the tourism industry with conservation and interpretation of abiotic nature attributes, besides considering related cultural issues, within the geosites for the general public".
 "A form of natural area tourism that specifically focuses on landscape and geology. It promotes tourism to geosites and the conservation of geo-diversity and an understanding of Earth sciences through appreciation and learning. This is achieved through independent visits to geological features, use of geo-trails and viewpoints, guided tours, geo-activities and patronage of geosite visitor centers".
 "The provision of interpretative and service facilities for geosites and geomorphosites and their encompassing topography, together with their associated in-situ and ex-situ artefacts, to constituency-build for their conservation by generating appreciation, learning and research by and for current and future generations".

Geotourism (abiotic nature-based tourism), a new approach
Geotourism adds to ecotourism's principal focus on plants (flora) and animals (fauna) by adding a third dimension to the abiotic environment. Thus it is growing around the world through the growth of geoparks as well as independently in many natural and urban areas where tourism focus in on the geological environment.

"Looking at the environment in a simplistic manner, we see that it is made up of Abiotic, Biotic and Cultural(ABC) attributes. Starting with the 'C' or cultural component first, we note that of three features it is this one which is generally the most known and interpreted, that is, through information about the built or cultural environment either in the past (historical accounts) or present (community customs and culture). The 'B' or biotic features of fauna (animals) and flora (plants) has seen a large focus of interpretation and understanding through ecotourism. But it is the first attribute of the 'A' or abiotic features including rocks, landforms and processes that has received the least attention in tourism, and consequently is the least known and understood.This then is the real power of geotourism, in that it puts the tourist spotlight firmly on geology, and brings it to the forefront of our understanding through tourism".

Comparison with ecotourism
Geotourism is a sister category to ecotourism. Geotourism is distinguished to be focused on abiotic nature and built environments dealing with geology and geomorphology while ecotourism is focused on the living nature dealing with ecology and living things.

Sectors
Geotourism sectors include:
 
 Urban
 Rural
 Roadcuts
 Dinosaurs 
 Meteorites
 Aerial
 Volcanoes 
 Wellness
 Mining
 Celestial
 Space
 Adventure
 Accessible  
 Underground

Geosites

A geosite is a location that has a particular geological or geomorphological significance. As well as its inherent geological characteristics it may also have cultural or heritage significance.

Geodiversity
Geodiversity is the variety of earth materials, forms and processes that constitute and shape the Earth, either the whole or a specific part of it.

Geotrails
According to the Geological Society of Australia, a geotrail "delivers geotourism experiences through a journey linked by an area's geology and landscape as the basis for providing visitor engagement, learning and enjoyment".

Geoparks
A geopark is a unified area that advances the protection and use of geological heritage in a sustainable way, and promotes the economic well-being of the people who live there.

Geoconservation

Geoconservation is the practice of recognising, protecting and managing sites and landscapes which have value for their geology or geomorphology. Geoconservation is carried out by a wide range of organisations from local geological societies to government agencies.Typically the conservation of geodiversity at a site or within a landscape takes place alongside that of biodiversity.

See also 
 Geoheritage
 Global Geoparks Network

References

Further reading
In a 500-word news article in 2020, one author (B.N. Sadry) mentioned many books on geotourism and chose their seven major reference books:
 Geotourism (2006) Co-edited by R. Dowling & D. Newsome
 Global Geotourism Perspectives (2010) Co-edited by R. Dowling & D. Newsome
 Geotourism: The Tourism of Geology and Landscape (2010) Co-edited by D. Newsome & R. Dowling 
 Geoheritage and Geotourism: a European Perspective (2016) Edited by T.A. Hose
 Geoheritage: Assessment, Protection and Management (2018) Co-edited by E. Reynard & J. Brilha 
 A Handbook of Geotourism (2018) Co-edited by R. Dowling & D. Newsome 
 The Geotourism Industry in the 21st Century (2021) Edited by B.N. Sadry

And some specialized ones on geotourism sectors, such as:

 Volcano and Geothermal Tourism: Sustainable Geo-Resources for Leisure and Recreation (2010) Co-edited by P. Erfurt-Cooper & M. Cooper

 Volcanic Tourist Destinations(2014) Edited by P. Erfurt-Cooper

 The Geoheritage of Hot Springs: Geoheritage, Geoparks and Geotourism(2021) Authored by P. Erfurt

There are also other books, including:
 The Principles of Geotourism (2015) Co-authored by A. Chen, L. Yunting & C.Y.N. Ng originally published in Chinese in 1991 by Peking University Press
 Global Geographical Heritage, Geoparks and Geotourism: Geoconservation and Development(2021) Edited by Singh, R. B., Wei, Dongying, Anand, Subhash

 Economics and Management of Geotourism(2022) Edited by   Braga, V., Duarte, A., Marques,  C. S.

 Geoheritage and Geotourism Resources: Education, Recreation, Sustainability(2022) Edited by   H. Drinia, P. Voudouris, A. Antonarakou

External links

Fundamentals of Geotourism
Geotourism's Global Growth - About Geological Tourism
Australian Geotourism Resource Centre
Principles of the Geotourism Industry

 
Types of tourism